Čedomir Đoinčević (born 5 May 1961) is a Serbian former football manager and player.

Playing career
After starting out at his local club Vranić, Đoinčević played for Žarkovo in the Belgrade Zone League. He would make his Yugoslav Second League debut with Crvenka in the 1984–85 season. Later on, Đoinčević joined Rad, making his Yugoslav First League debut in the 1987–88 season. He played regularly for the Građevinari over the years, appearing in the 1989–90 UEFA Cup.

In late summer 1990, Đoinčević moved abroad to Portugal and signed with Primeira Divisão newcomers Salgueiros. He helped the Paranhos side to a fifth-place finish in his first season, starting in all of his 36 appearances, as the club qualified to the 1991–92 UEFA Cup. During his spell with the club, Đoinčević shared teams with countrymen Stevan Milovac and Jovica Nikolić.

Managerial career
After hanging up his boots, Đoinčević enjoyed success as manager of his former club Rad, being voted best in the domestic league for 1999 in a poll organized by Politika. He was subsequently hired as manager of Bulgarian side Litex Lovech, before returning to Rad. Later on, Đoinčević was manager of Vojvodina from March to December 2002.

In August 2004, Đoinčević took charge of Greek club Kastoria. He was appointed as manager of Železnik in late April 2005, winning the Serbia and Montenegro Cup just four weeks later. After his third stint with Rad, Đoinčević served as manager of Serbian First League clubs Bežanija (October 2005–May 2006) and Voždovac (2007). He also worked at Laktaši in the top flight of Bosnia and Herzegovina football.

In December 2013, Đoinčević was appointed as sporting director of Rad, but stepped down in March 2014.

Honours
Železnik
 Serbia and Montenegro Cup: 2004–05

References

External links
 
 
 

1961 births
Living people
Footballers from Belgrade
Yugoslav footballers
Serbia and Montenegro footballers
Serbian footballers
Association football defenders
OFK Žarkovo players
FK Crvenka players
FK Rad players
S.C. Salgueiros players
FK Radnički Beograd players
Yugoslav Second League players
Yugoslav First League players
Primeira Liga players
First League of Serbia and Montenegro players
Yugoslav expatriate footballers
Serbia and Montenegro expatriate footballers
Expatriate footballers in Portugal
Serbia and Montenegro football managers
Serbian football managers
FK Rad managers
PFC Litex Lovech managers
FK Mladost Apatin managers
FK Vojvodina managers
FK Zemun managers
Kastoria F.C. managers
FK Železnik managers
FK Bežanija managers
FK Voždovac managers
FK Laktaši managers
Premier League of Bosnia and Herzegovina managers
Serbia and Montenegro expatriate football managers
Serbian expatriate football managers
Expatriate football managers in Bulgaria
Expatriate football managers in Greece
Expatriate football managers in Bosnia and Herzegovina
Serbia and Montenegro expatriate sportspeople in Bulgaria
Serbia and Montenegro expatriate sportspeople in Greece
Serbian expatriate sportspeople in Bosnia and Herzegovina
Serbian expatriate sportspeople in Portugal